The Bray-Barron House is a historic house in Eufaula, Alabama, U.S.. It was built prior to 1850 for Nathan Bray, who went on to serve in the Confederate States Army during the American Civil War of 1861-1865 alongside his three brothers. The house remained in the family until 1963. It was purchased by N. G. Barron and his wife Ruby Hutton Barron in 1965. It has been listed on the National Register of Historic Places since May 27, 1971.

References

Houses on the National Register of Historic Places in Alabama
Greek Revival houses in Alabama
Houses completed in 1845
Houses in Barbour County, Alabama